Pawn Stars is an American reality television series that premiered on History on July 19, 2009. The series is filmed in Las Vegas, Nevada, where it chronicles the activities at the World Famous Gold & Silver Pawn Shop, a 24-hour family business operated by patriarch Richard "Old Man" Harrison, his son Rick Harrison, Rick's son Corey "Big Hoss" Harrison, and Corey's childhood friend, Austin "Chumlee" Russell.

The descriptions of the items listed in this article reflect those given by their sellers and staff in the episodes, prior to their appraisal by experts as to their authenticity, unless otherwise noted.

Series overview

Episodes

Season 1 (2009)

Season 2 (2010)

Season 3 (2010–11)

Season 4 (2011)

Season 5 (2011–12)

Season 6 (2012)

Season 7 (2012–13)

Season 8 (2013)

Season 9 (2014)

Season 10 (2014)

Season 11 (2015)

Season 12 (2015–16)

Season 13 (2016–17)

Season 14 (2017)

Season 15 (2017–18)

Season 16 (2019)

Season 17 (2019–20)

Season 18 (2020–21)

Season 19 (2021)

Season 20 (2022)

Season 21 (2022)

Season 22 (2022)

Season 23 (2022–present)

Home releases

Notes

References 

General references

External links 
 
 
 The Gold and Silver Pawn Shop's official site

Lists of American reality television series episodes
Pawn Stars